The following low-power television stations broadcast on digital or analog channel 5 in the United States:

 K05AF-D in Mina/Luning, Nevada
 K05AH-D in Hot Springs, Montana
 K05AR-D in Rockville, Utah
 K05BE-D in Lehmi, etc., Idaho
 K05BU-D in Enterprise, Utah
 K05CF-D in Weaverville, California
 K05CR-D in Hayfork, California
 K05DQ-D in Burney, etc., California
 K05EM-D in Paradise, California
 K05EY-D in Terrace Lakes, Idaho
 K05FC-D in Lake McDonald, Montana
 K05FW-D in Girdwood, Alaska
 K05GA-D in Dolores, Colorado
 K05GJ-D in Thayne, etc., Wyoming
 K05GL-D in Coolin, Idaho
 K05GM-D in Plains-Paradise, Montana
 K05GQ-D in Kooskia, Idaho
 K05IZ-D in Hinsdale, Montana
 K05JU-D in Elko, Nevada
 K05JW-D in Ismay Canyon, Colorado
 K05KK-D in Poplar, Montana
 K05LI-D in Weber Canyon, Colorado
 K05ML-D in Sula, Montana
 K05MN-D in Logan, Utah
 K05MR-D in Bullhead City, Arizona
 K05MU-D in Leavenworth, Washington
 K05MW-D in Ferndale, Montana
 K05MX-D in Nephi, Utah
 K05ND-D in Long Valley Junction, Utah
 K05NE-D in Polson, Montana
 K05NF-D in Salina, Utah
 K05NG-D in Cedar Canyon, Utah
 K05NL-D in Reno, Nevada
 KAMK-LD in Eugene, Oregon
 KEVC-CD in Indio, California
 KPFW-LD in Dallas, Texas
 KQRY-LD in Fort Smith, Arkansas
 KRDH-LD in Cripple Creek, etc., Colorado
 KSCT-LP in Sitka, Alaska
 KTDJ-LD in Dayton, Texas
 KVHF-LD in Fresno, California
 KXDA-LD in Garland, Texas
 W05AA-D in Roanoke, Virginia
 W05AR-D in Bryson City, etc., North Carolina
 W05AW-D in Christiansted, U.S. Virgin Islands
 W05BV-D in Starkville, Mississippi
 W05CO-D in Sarasota, Florida
 W05CY-D in Mayaguez, Puerto Rico
 W05DA-D in Fajardo, Puerto Rico
 W05DB-D in Ponce, Puerto Rico
 W05DD-D in St. Francis, Maine
 WDGT-LD in Miami, Florida
 WDTO-LD in Orlando, Florida
 WEWF-LD in Jupiter, Florida
 WEXZ-LD in Bangor, Maine
 WFIB-LD in Key West, Florida
 WFIG-LD in Charlotte Amalie, U.S. Virgin Islands
 WFXZ-CD in Boston, Massachusetts, uses WGBH-TV's full-power spectrum
 WIVN-LD in Newcomerstown, Ohio
 WMBE-LD in Myrtle Beach, South Carolina
 WNYX-LD in New York, New York
 WRUF-LD in Gainesville, Florida
 WTNB-CD in Cleveland, Tennessee
 WTVF (DRT) in Nashville, Tennessee
 WXNJ-LD in Wanaque, New Jersey

The following low-power stations, which are no longer licensed, formerly broadcast on digital or analog channel 5:
 K05BK in Green River, Utah
 K05BR in Dunsmuir, etc., California
 K05CJ in Challis, Idaho
 K05DC in Cambridge, etc., Idaho
 K05DF in Mapleton, Oregon
 K05DS in St. Regis, Montana
 K05DV in Escalante, Utah
 K05EF in Brady, etc., Texas
 K05EK in Mazama, Washington
 K05EQ in Green Point, etc., California
 K05ET-D in Likely, California
 K05FG in McCall, etc., Idaho
 K05FI in Delta Junction, Alaska
 K05FJ in Manila, etc., Utah
 K05FO in Ridgecrest, etc., California
 K05FR-D in Crowley Lake, California
 K05GC in Rexford/Fortine, Montana
 K05GD in Smith, etc., Nevada
 K05GX in East Price, Utah
 K05GY in New Castle, etc., Colorado
 K05GZ in Black Butte Ranch, Oregon
 K05HA in Glennallen, etc., Alaska
 K05HB in Cedar City, Utah
 K05HE in Glenwood Springs, Colorado
 K05IJ in Eagle Village, Alaska
 K05JK in Mineral, California
 K05JN in Montezuma Creek-Aneth, Utah
 K05JS in Ticaboo, Utah
 K05JT in Pitkin, Colorado
 K05JV in La Pine, Oregon
 K05KF in Dillingham, Alaska
 K05KX in Tillamook, Oregon
 K05KY in Lincoln City, Oregon
 K05LE in Astoria, Oregon
 K05LP in Ryndon, Nevada
 K05LU in Jefferson City, Missouri
 K05LY in Moberly, Missouri
 K05MY-D in Bakersfield, California
 KCEM-LD in Chelan Butte, Washington
 KDSI-LP in Carthage, Missouri
 KHHB-LP in Hilo, Hawaii
 KRCW-LP in Portland, Oregon
 W05AE in Sylva, etc., North Carolina
 W05AF in Cherokee, North Carolina
 W05AO in Pickens, South Carolina
 W05AP in Brasstown, etc., North Carolina

References

05 low-power